Gustavo de Jesus Quintero Morales, better known as "El Loko", (23 December 1939 – 18 December 2016) was a Colombian singer-songwriter. He is considered one of the great representatives of the Colombian tropical music.

Early life 
Quintero studied at the Édgar Poe Restrepo school in Medellín and from an early age he has shown his musical skills. He participated in choirs of churches and received classes at the school of Fine Arts in Medellín. "El Loko", as he was known, studied Economics at the University of Antioquia, which he didn't finish. He was called "Loko" for his stage antics.

Career 
When he lived in Cali, he formed the band Los Gatos. He was also a singer with The Teen Agers. Upon his return to Medellín he formed the group Los Hispanos. Then he left Los Hispanos (Codiscos), with Rodolfo Aicardi replacing him, and formed Los Graduados.

"Asi Empezaron Papa Y Mama" was a famous dance song of Los Graduados. He was the first showman of Colombian tropical music.

Quintero is one of the most imitated artists in both style and music, many musical groups dedicating themselves to perform his music during the Christmas season.

Death 
Quintero had had several health problems and complications throughout his life. His death occurred on the Sunday of 18 December 2016 at 1:40 in the morning at the Las Americas Clinic in Medellín to stomach cancer.

Songs
 La Cinta Verde
 Asi Empezaron Papa Y Mama
 Ese Muerto no Lo Cargo Yo (Don Goyo)
 Fantasia Nocturna (Lucerito)
 Carita De Angel
 La Pelea Del siglo
 La Banda Del Vecino
 La Maestranza
 Juanito Preguntón
 Quinceañera
 El Coquero

References

 Gustavo Quintero  Codiscos 
 Gustavo Quintero – detalles  Codiscos 
 Gustavo Quintero – Productos Info  Discos Fuentes 
 Gustavo Quintero  Discos Fuentes 
 Gustavo Quintero  Discos Fuentes 
 Gustavo Quintero ajustó 50 años de poner a bailar a los colombianos en diciembre 
 Aconsejo de rionegro con gustavo el loco quintero y las glorias del deporte rionegro 
 Los Mejores, Los Hispanos, Los Graduados 
 Los graduados  iTunes 
 Gustavo Y Su Combo Gran Colombia – Gustavo Quintero

External links
 Official video of the La Pelea Del Siglo
  Official video of the El Aguardientosky
 Official video of the El Adios
 Official video of the Asi Empezaron Papa Y Mama

1939 births
2016 deaths
Colombian singer-songwriters
Musicians from Medellín
20th-century Colombian male singers
21st-century Colombian male singers
Deaths from cancer in Colombia
Deaths from stomach cancer